Apollo and Daphne is a c.1470–1480 oil on panel painting, attributed to Piero del Pollaiuolo and/or his brother Antonio). William Coningham acquired it in Rome in 1845 and in 1876 Wynne Ellis left it to the National Gallery, London, where it still hangs. It shows Daphne's transformation into a laurel tree to escape Apollo in Ovid's Metamorphoses.

Its choice of wood as a support and its small dimensions mean that it was long mistaken as a fragment of a decorative cassone. Like The Martyrdom of Saint Sebastian it was also long attributed to Antonio but is now usually attributed to Piero. The background vegetation was previously brighter but is now irreversibly oxidized.

References

Further reading

External links
 

Paintings by Piero del Pollaiuolo
Collections of the National Gallery, London
1470s paintings
Paintings of Apollo
Paintings based on Metamorphoses
Paintings by Antonio del Pollaiuolo